Joseph Phillips (28 July 1891 – 10 December 1958) was a Barbadian cricketer. He played in four first-class matches for the Barbados cricket team from 1919 to 1923.

See also
 List of Barbadian representative cricketers

References

External links
 

1891 births
1958 deaths
Barbadian cricketers
Barbados cricketers
People from Saint John, Barbados